Chris Smith (born 1970) is an American filmmaker. He directed American Movie, which was awarded the Grand Jury Prize for Documentary at the 1999 Sundance Film Festival.

Career
Smith completed his first film, American Job, while attending the University of Wisconsin–Milwaukee's Graduate Film Program. He was nominated for a "Someone to Watch Award" from the Independent Spirit Awards. Smith met Mark Borchardt, the subject of American Movie, while editing American Job, and began filming a documentary about the making of Borchardt's psychological thriller Coven.  Both films played at the Sundance Film Festival, and American Movie was bought by Sony Pictures for $1 million.

Later works
His resume also included the Emmy-nominated Jim & Andy (2017), about the making of the 1999 Andy Kaufman biopic Man on the Moon.

Smith wrote and directed the documentary Fyre: The Greatest Party That Never Happened (2019), about the Fyre Festival fraud.

He also made a documentary about director Robert Downey Sr., co-directing together with Kevin Ford. The project, simply titled "Sr.", was produced by Team Downey, Robert Downey Jr.'s production company.

Filmography

References

External links

Libraryfilms.com

Interview with Chris Smith

1970 births
Living people
American film directors
Filmmakers from Milwaukee
University of Wisconsin–Milwaukee alumni
Place of birth missing (living people)